José Vicente Train (born 19 December 1931 in Barcelona, Catalonia) is a retired Spanish football goalkeeper.

During his career he played for RCD Espanyol, Real Madrid, RCD Mallorca and Deportivo de La Coruña. He also earned 7 caps for the Spain national football team.

Honours
Real Madrid
Intercontinental Cup: 1960
Spanish League: 1960–61, 1961–62, 1962–63, 1963–64 
Spanish Cup: 1961–62
Zamora Trophy: 1960–61, 1962–63, 1963–64

External links
 
 National team data at BDFutbol
 
 RCD Espanyol profile 
 Real Madrid profile

1931 births
Living people
Footballers from Barcelona
Spanish footballers
Association football goalkeepers
La Liga players
Segunda División players
Tercera División players
RCD Espanyol footballers
Real Madrid CF players
RCD Mallorca players
Deportivo de La Coruña players
Spain B international footballers
Spain international footballers
UA Horta players